Jim Nelson may refer to:
Jim Nelson (hurling manager) (1938–2015), Irish hurling manager
Jim Nelson (drag racer), competed in the 1962 NHRA Winternationals
Jim Nelson (baseball) (1947–2004), American baseball pitcher
Jim Nelson (editor) (born 1963), American editor of GQ magazine
Jim Nelson (American football) (born 1975), American football linebacker
Jim Nelson (artist), American role-playing games artist

See also
Jimmy Nelson (disambiguation)
James Nelson (disambiguation)